European Union of Water Management Associations (EUWMA) members are (umbrella) organizations in the EU member states representing organizations based on public law responsible for regional and local water management (flood protection, land drainage, water level management, irrigation) such as internal drainage boards or Waterschappen.
 
At present, organizations from Belgium, France, Germany, Hungary, Italy, the Netherlands, Spain and United Kingdom are members of EUWMA.

EUWMA represents over 8.600 individual organizations, covering over 50 mln. ha.

Objectives

 To increase cooperation in the field of water management between the European Water Management Associations so as to provide relevant information, views, position papers, and policy documents to National Governments, the European Commission, the European Parliament and other relevant institutions.
 To exchange knowledge, experiences and views between the members.

Constituent organisations

 Association of Drainage Authorities (ADA) - United Kingdom
 Association des Wateringues Wallonnes (AWW) - Belgium 
 Associazione Nationale Bonifiche, Irrigazione e Miglioramenti Fondiari (ANBI) - Italy 
 Federación nacional de comunidades de regantes de España (FENACORE) - Spain 
 Forum des Marais Atlantiques - France
 Institution Interdépartementale Nord-Pas-de-Calais Pour la réalisation des ouvrages généraux d'évacuation des * crues de la région des Wateringues - France
 Társulati Informatikai Rendszer (TIR) - Hungary
 Unie van Waterschappen (UVW) - The Netherlands
 Vereniging van Vlaamse Polders en Wateringen (VVPW) - Belgium 
 Deutscher Bund der verbandlichen Wasserwirtschaft (DBVW) - Germany

See also
International trade and water

References

Water management authorities
European Union